Usui (written 碓井, 碓氷, 臼井, 笛吹 or 卯水) is a Japanese surname.

Notable people with it include :

 Hana Usui (born 1973), Japanese artist
 Hideo Usui (born 1939), Japanese politician
 , Japanese football manager
 Hiroyuki Usui (born 1953), former Japanese football player and manager
 Hitoshi Usui (born 1988), Japanese football player
 Junichi Usui (born 1957), retired Japanese long jumper
 Kaoru Usui (born 1916), Japanese photographer
 Kempei Usui (born 1987), Japanese footballer
 Kohei Usui (born 1979), Japanese football player
 Masahiro Usui (born 1991), Japanese actor
 Masako Usui (born 1968), Japanese newscaster
 Mikao Usui (1865–1926), religious teacher, founder of Reiki
 Mikoto Usui, Japanese economist
 Rie Usui (born 1989), Japanese women's footballer
 Usui Sadamitsu, warrior of the mid-Heian period
 Yoshimi Usui (1905–1987), Japanese author and critic
 Yoshito Usui (1958–2009), Japanese manga artist

Fictional characters 
 Takumi Usui, a character in anime and manga series Maid Sama!
 Kazuyoshi Usui or Switch, a character in anime and manga series Sket Dance
 Horokeu Usui or Horohoro, a character in anime and manga series Shaman King
 Uonuma Usui, a character in anime and manga series Rurouni Kenshin
 Kagerou Usui, a character in the anime and manga series Sayonara Zetsubou Sensei

Japanese-language surnames